Cheap Time is a Nashville-based garage rock band, fronted by Jeffrey Novak. The band, which formed in 2006, has toured with Jay Reatard, Yo La Tengo, Guitar Wolf, and Mudhoney. They have released seven 7-inch singles, and four studio albums on In the Red Records: Cheap Time (2008), Fantastic Explanations (2010), Wallpaper Music (2012), and Exit Smiles (2013).

Sound
Cheap Time mixes glam rock riffs and power pop melodies with elements of punk rock. The band's earlier sound was compared to early Redd Kross and The Quick. Their second album was compared to The Kinks and Alex Chilton, while their third album has been compared to classic punk bands The Saints and Magazine. Novak has stated that his favorite recording artists are John Cale, Kevin Ayers, and Peter Hammill.

Line ups

Cheap Time #1 (2007)
for the "Spolied Brat" 7-inch EP (Sweet Rot Records, SRR02):
Jeffrey Novak: guitar
Jemina Pearl: bass
Nathan Vasquez: drums

Cheap Time #2 (2007)
for the "Handy Man" b/w "Wildlife" 7-inch (Douchemater Records, DMR016):
Jeffrey Novak: guitar, keyboard, vocals
Stephen Braren: bass, vocals
Jon Sewell: drums, percussion

Cheap Time #3 (2008)
for the Cheap Time LP/CD (In the Red Records, ITR152):
Jeffrey Novak: guitar, vocals
Stephen Braren: bass, vocals
Jon Sewell: drums

Cheap Time #4 (2009–2010)
for the "Woodland Drive" b/w "Penny and Jenny" 7-inch (In the Red Records, ITR176) and Fantastic Explanations (And Similar Situations) LP/CD (In the Red Records, ITR190):
Jeffrey Novak: guitar, vocals
Stephen Braren: bass, vocals, keys
Ryan Sweeney: drums

Cheap Time #5 (2011)
for Wallpaper Music LP/CD (In the Red Records, ITR223):
Jeffrey Novak: guitar, vocals
Ryan Sweeney: drums
Matthew Allen: bass, vocals

Cheap Time #6 (2012)
for the "Other Stories" b/w "In This World" 7-inch (Sweet Rot Records, SRR-31):
Jeffrey Novak: guitar, vocals
Ryan Sweeney: drums
Cole Kinnear: bass, vocals

Cheap Time #7 (current line-up)
for Exit Smiles LP/CD (In The Red Records, ITR247):
Jeffrey Novak: guitar, vocals
Ryan Sweeney: drums
Jessica McFarland: bass, vocals

Discography

Singles
"Spoiled Brat" 7-inch (Sweet Rot Records, 2007, SRR 02) 
A1. Spoiled Brat 
B1. Jet Set 
B2. Killing Time

"Handy Man" 7-inch (Douchemaster Records, 2007, DMR 016) 
A1. Handy Man 
B1. Wildlife

"Woodland Drive" 7-inch (In the Red Records, 2009, ITR 176)
A1. Woodland Drive
B1. Penny & Jenny

"Another Time" 7-inch (Cass Records, 2011, MAMA-057)
A1. Another Time
B1. Immediate Future

"Other Stories" 7-inch (Sweet Rot Records, 2012, SSR 31)
A1. Other Stories
B1. In This World

Live at Third Man 7-inch (Third Man Records, 2012, TMR160)
A1. Macbeth (John Cale)
B1. Going Out The Way You Came In

"Goodbye Age" 7-inch (Total Punk Records, 2013, TPR-16)
A1. Goodbye Age
B1. Soon Over Soon

Albums
Cheap Time LP/CD (In the Red, 2008, ITR 152) 
 Too Late 
 Glitter and Gold 
 Zig-Zag 
 People Talk (The End, Jack Oblivian) 
 Push Your Luck 
 Living in the Past 
 Tight Fit 
 Permanent Damage 
 The Ballad of Max Frost 
 Falling Down 
 Over Again 
 Ginger Snap 
 Back to School 
 Trip to the Zoo

Fantastic Explanations (and Similar Situations) LP/CD (In The Red, 2010, ITR 190) 
 When Tomorrow Comes
 Everyone Knows
 I'd Rather Be Alone
 Throwing It All Away
 Down the Tube
 Showboat
 Miss Apparent
 June Child
 Woodland Drive
 Lazy Days
 Approximately Nowhere
 Waiting Too Long

Two and a Half Times Around LP (Demos, live on WMFU) (Self-released, 2010) 
 Woodland Drive
 Glitter and Gold 
 Zig-Zag 
 Back to School
 Living in the Past 
 People Talk
 When Tomorrow Comes
 Penny and Jenny 
 Handy Man
 Wildlife
 Down the Tube
 Falling Down
 Over Again
 Trip to the Zoo
 Too Late
 Glitter and Gold
 Zig-Zag
 Back to School
 Fake Friends
 Ginger Snap

Wallpaper Music LP/CD (In the Red, 2012, ITR 223) 
 More Cigarettes
 Straight and Narrow
 Hall of Mirrors
 Another Time
 Take It If You Want It
 Dream It Up
 Night to Night
 Witches In-Stock
 Typically Strange
 Underneath the Fruit Flies

Exit Smiles LP/CD (In the Red, 2013, ITR 247)
 Exit Smiles
 Same Surprise
 Kill the Light
 Country and City
 Slow Variety
 8:05
 Spark in the Chain
 Modern Taste

References

External links
Cheap Time on MySpace
In the Red Records

Garage rock groups from Tennessee
Musical groups established in 2006
2006 establishments in Tennessee
In the Red artists